Frederick James "Mulga" Davies (14 August 1921 – 13 August 1961) was an Australian rules footballer who played in the Victorian Football League (VFL).

Family
The son of William Phillip Davies (1884–1983), and Marian Davies (1885–1963), née Thompson, Frederick James Davies was born at Seaford, Victoria on 14 August 1921.

He married Joan Mason in 1948, and was the father of the famous Tasmanian dual Olympic basketballer Ian Davies (1956–2013).

Football
Davies played as both a follower and key position forward.

Carlton
Cleared to Carlton from Seaford Football Club in April 1941, he made his senior debut for Carlton on 2 August 1941, in the Round 14 match against Hawthorn; and, having enlisted in the Second AIF, he did not play again until he returned from overseas service in 1946. He kicked four goals in the 1947 VFL Grand Final, in which Carlton defeated Essendon by a point.

In 1949 he played for Victoria against New South Wales.

Longford
Fred Davies was appointed captain-coach of Longford Football Club in the Northern Tasmanian Football Association (NTFA) in 1953.

He played in 105 games as Lonford's playin-coach from 1953 to 1960. Longford won the competition's premiership in 1955, 1957, and 1958 and, also, won the Tasmanian State Premiership in 1957.

"[Davies'] importance in the history of the Longford Football Club was emphasised when he was selected as captain-coach and first ruckman in the club's official 'Team of the Century'."

Tasmanian Football Hall of Fame
In 2010 he was inducted into the Tasmanian Football Hall of Fame.

Military service
He enlisted in the Second AIF on 11 October 1941, served overseas, and was formally discharged on 18 July 1946.

Death 
He died at his Seaford home on 13 August 1961, the eve of his fortieth birthday.

See also
 Tasmanian Football Hall of Fame

Footnotes

References

 World War Two Nominal Roll: Sapper Frederick James Davies (V215852).
 League Teams of 1950: Carlton, The Argus Weekend Magazine, (Saturday, 10 June 1950), p.1.

External links

 Fred Davies' profile at Blueseum
 Fred Davies, australianfootball.com.
 Fred Davies, at Boyles Football Photos.

1921 births
1961 deaths
Carlton Football Club players
Carlton Football Club Premiership players
Longford Football Club players
Australian rules footballers from Melbourne
Tasmanian Football Hall of Fame inductees
One-time VFL/AFL Premiership players
Australian Army personnel of World War II
Australian Army soldiers
People from the City of Frankston
Military personnel from Melbourne